The 2007 edition of R League was held from March 30 to October 18. It was the first season in which Gyeongnam FC participated.

Pohang Steelers won the competition for the first time by defeating Seongnam Ilhwa Chunma in final on penalties on 18 October 2007.

League standing

Group A

Group B

Group C

Championship playoff

Semifinals

Final
First leg

Second leg

External links
 R League 2007 table

R League seasons
2007 in South Korean football